Spalding Township is a civil township of Menominee County in the U.S. state of Michigan. The population was 1,761 at the 2000 census. It is named after Jesse Spalding (1833–1904), who operated a steam sawmill on the Menominee River.

Geography

Communities
Eustis was a station on the Minneapolis, St. Paul and Sault Ste. Marie Railroad.  It had a post office from 1891 until 1912.

Demographics
As of the census of 2000, there were 1,761 people, 625 households, and 426 families residing in the township.  The population density was 10.8 per square mile (4.2/km).  There were 899 housing units at an average density of 5.5 per square mile (2.1/km).  The racial makeup of the township was 98.52% White, 0.57% Native American, 0.06% Asian, 0.11% from other races, and 0.74% from two or more races. Hispanic or Latino of any race were 0.40% of the population.

There were 625 households, out of which 28.5% had children under the age of 18 living with them, 56.8% were married couples living together, 7.0% had a female householder with no husband present, and 31.8% were non-families. 26.6% of all households were made up of individuals, and 13.0% had someone living alone who was 65 years of age or older.  The average household size was 2.50 and the average family size was 3.02.

In the township the population was spread out, with 22.0% under the age of 18, 7.0% from 18 to 24, 24.4% from 25 to 44, 23.3% from 45 to 64, and 23.2% who were 65 years of age or older.  The median age was 43 years. For every 100 females, there were 94.6 males.  For every 100 females age 18 and over, there were 94.5 males.

The median income for a household in the township was $31,625, and the median income for a family was $37,381. Males had a median income of $30,766 versus $22,153 for females. The per capita income for the township was $15,423.  About 9.6% of families and 12.8% of the population were below the poverty line, including 19.7% of those under age 18 and 13.4% of those age 65 or over.

References

Townships in Menominee County, Michigan
Marinette micropolitan area
Townships in Michigan